George Wallace Mayo (December 27, 1893 – August 1987) was an American Negro league first baseman in the 1910s.

A native of Morton, Pennsylvania, Mayo played for the Hilldale Club in 1917. In his six recorded games, he posted four hits in 20 plate appearances. Mayo died in 1987 at age 93.

References

External links
 and Seamheads

1893 births
1987 deaths
Date of death missing
Place of death missing
Hilldale Club players
Baseball first basemen
Baseball players from Pennsylvania
People from Delaware County, Pennsylvania
20th-century African-American sportspeople